The following is a list of games developed by Westwood Studios.

Video games

As Westwood Associates

As Westwood Studios

Ports

References

Westwood Studios